The following is a list of squads for each nation competing at the 2013 World Baseball Classic (WBC). The deadline for submitting provisional rosters was January 16, but teams had until February 20 to finalize their roster decisions. Provisional rosters were announced on January 17, and final rosters were announced on February 20.

In the WBC, starting pitchers are allowed to throw 65 pitches in first-round games. This limit increases to 80 in the second round and 95 in the semifinal and final rounds. If a starting pitcher throws over 50 pitches in a game, he must not pitch again for a minimum of four days. Relief pitchers are allowed to pitch on consecutive days only if they threw less than 30 pitches on the previous day. Pitchers are not allowed to pitch on three consecutive days under any circumstances.

Injured players could be freely replaced before the team's first game. Once a team begins play, injured catchers can be replaced at any time, but other injured players cannot be replaced until the team advances to the next round of the tournament.

The United States provisional roster is made up entirely of players from Major League Baseball (MLB), and the Dominican Republic provisional roster has only one player not signed to a team for the 2013 season. The Canadian team has 12 players who appeared in MLB in 2012, while Japan has none (three prominent Japanese MLB players, Yu Darvish, Ichiro Suzuki and two-time defending WBC MVP Daisuke Matsuzaka, chose not to play). Though five members who competed for the Cuban national team in the 2009 WBC have since defected, the Cuban team is considered strong. Three members of MLB.com's Top 100 prospect list are participating in the 2013 WBC: Xander Bogaerts, Eddie Rosario, and Jameson Taillon.

Pool A

Manager Barry Larkin
Coaches Tiago Caldeira, Marcos Guimarães, Go Kuroki, Ricardo Matumaru, Mitsuyoshi Sato, Satiro Watanabe

Manager John McLaren
Coaches Bob Buskett, Art Howe, Bruce Hurst, Yi Sheng, Yufeng Zhang

Manager Víctor Mesa
Coaches Angel Castillo, Juan de Dios Pena, Primitivo Diaz, Victor Figueroa, Jorge Riscart, Pedro Rodriguez

Manager Koji Yamamoto
Coaches Osamu Higashio, Masataka Nashida, Tsuyoshi Yoda, Kazuyoshi Tatsunami, Nobuhiro Takashiro, Koichi Ogata

Pool B

Manager Jon Deeble
Coaches Phil Dale, Michael Collins, Tony Harris, Greg Jelks, Graeme Lloyd, Glenn Williams

Note: All player birthplaces are in Australia unless indicated otherwise.

Manager Chang-Heng Hsieh
Coaches Cheng-Hsun Hsieh, Chih-Feng Chen, Wei-Chen Chen, Jung-Hua Liu, Chen-Hao Wang, Chun-Chang Yeh

Manager Hensley Meulens
Coaches Bert Blyleven, Brian Farley, Steve Janssen, Wim Martinus, Tjerk Smeets, Ben Thijssen

Manager Joongil Ryu
Coaches Yongduk Han, DongSoo Kim, Hansoo Kim, Jungtae Park, Jihyun Ryu, Sangmmoon Yang

Pool C

Manager Tony Peña
Coaches Bill Castro, José Canó, Félix Fermín, Denny González, Alfredo Griffin, Juan Samuel
Special Assistant Michael Santiago-Smith

Manager Edwin Rodríguez
Coaches Ricky Bones, Carlos Baerga, Carlos Delgado, Joey Espada, José Rosado, José Valentín

Manager Mauro Mazzotti
Coaches Renny Duarte, Felix Cano, Candelario Diaz, Manny Crespo, José Alguacil, Miguel Erroz

Manager Luis Dorante, Luis Sojo
Coaches Wilson Álvarez, Marco Davalillo, Sr., Andrés Galarraga, Carlos García, Omar Malave

Pool D

Manager Ernie Whitt
Coaches Larry Walker, Denis Boucher, Stubby Clapp, Greg Hamilton, Tim Leiper, Paul Quantrill

Note: All player birthplaces are in Canada unless indicated otherwise.

Manager Marco Mazzieri
Coaches William Holmberg, Frank Catalanotto, Alberto D'Auria, Gilberto Gerali, Mike Piazza, Tom Trebelhorn

Manager Rick Renteria
Coaches Rubén Amaro, Juan Castro, Teddy Higuera, Ever Magallanes, Sid Monge, Fernando Valenzuela

Note: All player birthplaces are in Mexico unless indicated otherwise.

Manager Joe Torre
Coaches Larry Bowa, Marcel Lachemann, Greg Maddux, Dale Murphy, Gerald Perry, Willie Randolph

Note: All player birthplaces are in the United States.

Notes

References

World Baseball Classic 2013
Rosters